F. Vernon Boozer (born January 30, 1936) was a Republican State Senator for District 9 in Maryland.

Background
Boozer served Maryland as a Republican delegate and state senator for nearly 30 years.  He has served District 9, which is a portion of Baltimore County.  In 1986, he ran unopposed and defeated Howard W. Kramer Sr. in the primary election with 91% of the vote.

He faced a Democratic challenger in 1990, but Kauko H. Kokkonen only managed to secure 20% of the vote to Boozer's 80%.

In 1994, Boozer again ran unopposed.  His biggest challenge was in the Republican Primary where John C. Head managed to get 48% of the vote.

In 1998, Boozer was defeated in the Republican primary, by his challenge Andrew P. Harris.  Harris won the race with 54% of the vote to Boozer's 46%.  Harris went on to defeat Anthony O. Blades in the general election.  According to an article in The Washington Post, Boozer may have lost his election bid because of his pro-choice views in a very conservative district.

Education
Boozer graduated from Duke University in Durham, North Carolina with his A.B. in 1958.  He returned to college and received his J.D. from the University of Maryland School of Law in 1964.

Career
After law school, Boozer entered into the practice of law.  He was then selected to be a Trial Magistrate for Baltimore County and served from 1967 until 1968.

In 1971, Boozer was first elected to the Maryland House of Delegates.  He served in the House until 1979.  During that time he was a member of the Economic Matter Committee and the Judiciary Committee.

In 1981, he was first elected to the Maryland Senate.  He served in the Maryland Senate until 1999.  Boozer was the minority leader from 1996 until he was defeated in 1999.  Boozer was also a minority whip, holding this position from 1990 until 1996. 
During his time in the Senate he was on the Finance Committee for two stints (1981–84 & 1991–92), the Executive Nominations Committee from 1984 until 1994, the Judicial Proceedings Committee, also for two stints, (1985–90 & 1993–94), and the  Joint Budget and Audit Committee from 1984 until 1994. Other committees that he served on include the Legislative Policy Committee, 1990–99, the Joint Committee on Administrative, Executive and Legislative Review, 1994, the Budget and Taxation Committee, 1995–99, the Rules Committee, 1995–99, the Joint Committee on the Management of Public Funds, 1995–99, and the  Spending Affordability Committee, 1996–99.  Finally, he was a member of the Special Study Commission on the Maryland Public Ethics Law from 1998 until 1999. 
In addition to his work as a state senator and state delegate, Boozer also was selected to be a delegate to the Republican Party National Convention in 1996. He was also once presented with the Best in Class award from the Maryland Chamber of Commerce in 1997.

In 2000, Boozer was appointed by Republican Governor Bob Ehrlich to serve as vice chair on the Special Committee on Voting Systems & Election Procedures in Maryland.  This committee was charged with evaluating the election systems in Maryland, to evaluate procedures for recounts and contested election, and to ensure fair elections.

In 2002, Boozer was tapped again Governor Ehrlich to a four-year term to serve on the State Advisory Council on Administrative Hearings, along with Nancy S. Grasmick, Nathan J. Greenbaum, Susan Dishler Shubin, Evelyn B. McCarter, and Suzanne M. Owen.
In 2018, Maryland Governor Larry Hogan appointed Boozer to the Maryland Lottery and Gaming Control Commission.
Since his life in office, Boozer has engaged in multiple activities.  He is active in the Maryland Legal Services Corporation. He also continues to practice law with Covahey, Boozer, Devan, & Dore, P.A.in Towson, Maryland.

References

External links
http://archive1.mdarchives.state.md.us/msa/speccol/sc5100/sc5123/000001/html/boozer.html

University of Maryland Francis King Carey School of Law alumni
1936 births
Living people
Republican Party Maryland state senators
Republican Party members of the Maryland House of Delegates
Politicians from Norfolk, Virginia
Politicians from Baltimore
Duke University alumni